Kevin Jon Heller is a scholar of international law who is Professor of International Law & Security at the University of Copenhagen's Centre for Military Studies. He has also taught at the University of Amsterdam, SOAS, University of London, and Melbourne Law School. Heller was described by one reviewer as "an accomplished scholar, multi-published writer, and heralded blogger on the most current and controversial topics in international law". He is co-editor-in-chief of the international-law blog Opinio Juris.

Works

References

Living people
International law scholars
Academic staff of the Australian National University
Year of birth missing (living people)